The 1960 Special U.S. Senate election in North Dakota was held June 28, 1960, to fill the United States Senate seat vacated by the late William Langer. Langer died in office on November 8, 1959, and Clarence Norman Brunsdale, a former Governor of North Dakota, was temporarily appointed to the seat on November 19 of that year until the special election was held. North Dakota Democratic-NPL Party candidate Quentin N. Burdick faced Republican John E. Davis for election to the seat. Davis had been serving as Governor of the state since 1957.

Davis had been very popular during his tenure as Governor of the state, and Burdick had been serving in North Dakota's At-large congressional district for the past two years. His father, Usher L. Burdick, who represented North Dakota for twenty years in the United States House of Representatives, died during the campaign. This race between two popular candidates made for the second-closest race in the history of North Dakota's U.S. Senate elections, with Burdick being determined the winner by just over 1,100 votes.

Two independent candidates, Eugene Van Der Hoeven and Clarence Haggard, also filed before the deadline and could have played a factor in determining the outcome since their total votes were more than double that of the 1,100 votes that made Burdick the winner. Haggard would later try again for one of the state's senate seats in 1976.

Election results

See also 
 United States Senate elections, 1960 and 1961

Notes

External links
1960 Special North Dakota U.S. Senate Election results

North Dakota
1960
North Dakota 1960
1960 North Dakota elections
North Dakota 1960
United States Senate 1960